Up Pompeii is a 1971 British sex comedy film directed by Bob Kellett and starring Frankie Howerd and Michael Hordern. The film was shot at Elstree Film Studios, Borehamwood, England and is based on characters that first appeared in the British television sitcom Up Pompeii! (1969–1975).

Plot
Lurcio becomes the inadvertent possessor of a scroll bearing all the names of the proposed assassins of Nero. The conspirators need to recover the scroll fast, but it has fallen into the hands of Lurcio's master, Ludicrus Sextus, who mistakenly reads the contents of the scroll to the Senate. Farcical attempts are made to retrieve the scroll before Pompeii is eventually consumed by the erupting Vesuvius.

Cast

Production
The Robert Stigwood Organisation had money in the film.

A version was made for American audiences with six minutes of additional footage including a prologue and epilogue and Lurcio setting the scene.

Reception

Box office
The film was the 10th most popular film at the British box office in 1971. By June 1972 it had earned EMI a profit of £20,000.

References

External links
 

1971 films
1970s sex comedy films
1970s historical comedy films
British sex comedy films
British historical comedy films
Films shot at EMI-Elstree Studios
Films shot in England
Films based on television series
Films directed by Bob Kellett
Films scored by Carl Davis
Films set in the Roman Empire
Films set in 79 AD
Pompeii in popular culture
EMI Films films
1971 comedy films
Films with screenplays by Sid Colin
Depictions of Nero on film
Films about assassinations
1970s English-language films
1970s British films